Greg Rusedski was the defending champion but lost in the second round.

Tim Henman won in the final 6–4, 6–4, 6–4 against Tommy Haas.

Seeds

Draw

Final

Section 1

Section 2

External links
 2000 CA-TennisTrophy draw

Singles

it:Bank Austria Tennis Trophy 1999 - Singolare